ARCIC may refer to:
 Anglican–Roman Catholic International Commission
 United States Army Capabilities Integration Center